The 2010 UCI Mountain Bike World Cup included three disciplines: cross-country, downhill and four-cross.

Cross-country

Downhill

Four-Cross

See also
2010 UCI Mountain Bike & Trials World Championships

External links
 Homepage

UCI Mountain Bike World Cup
Mountain Bike World Cup